Senator Parks may refer to:

David Parks (politician) (born 1943), Nevada State Senate
Rita Potts Parks (born 1962), Mississippi State Senate

See also
George S. Park (1811–1890), Missouri State Senate